Apple Pie is a 1993 album by the Australian indie rock band Nice.

Track listing
"Casandra Nova" – 2:52
"Mr. Lee" – 2:51
"Cup of Coffee" – 2:35
"On My Back in the Madhouse" – 4:30
"Total Moon" – 3:28
"My Perfect Fire" – 4:03
"Hi Tension" – 3:00
"Curse of the Lees" – 2:25
"Seven Daze" – 3:34
"Doledrums" – 4:10
"Cunning and Sly" – 3:19
"Fucked Around" – 2:41
"Now" – 3:27

References

1993 compilation albums
The Nice albums